Vitaly Yurievich Kirinchuk (born 2 September 1970) is a retired Russian swimmer who won a gold medal in the 4×100 m medley relay and a bronze medal in the 100 m breaststroke events at the 1993 European Aquatics Championships.

He graduated from the Lesgaft National State University of Physical Education, and after retirement from competitions worked as a coach in swimming, volleyball and basketball at the Saint-Petersburg University of Humanities and Social Sciences.

References

1970 births
Living people
Russian male swimmers
Male butterfly swimmers
European Aquatics Championships medalists in swimming